Spout may refer to:

 A lip used to funnel content as on various containers like a teapot, pitcher, watering can, driptorch, grole, cruet, etc.
 A water spout from a roof, such as a gargoyle
 Downspout, of a rain gutter

Natural and weather phenomena
 Spout, the action of a geyser
 Landspout, weather phenomenon
 Waterspout, weather phenomenon

Waterfalls
 Spout, an alternate name for a waterfall
 Spout of Garnock, waterfall in Scotland
 Cautley Spout, waterfall in England

Other
 Water spout, an element of a roller coaster element
 Air expelled through the blowhole of a whale

See also
 
 
 Snout Spout, fictional character in the Masters of the Universe franchise
 Spout Run, a small stream in Arlington County, Virginia, US
 Spout Spring, Virginia, US
 Spout Springs, North Carolina, US
 Spout Springs Ski Area, Oregon, US
 Spouting can, physics experiment
 Spurt (disambiguation)